Sakuraeolis enosimensis is a species of sea slug, an aeolid nudibranch, a marine gastropod mollusc in the family Facelinidae.

Distribution
This species was described from Japan. It has been reported from Japan and Hong Kong and has been reported as introduced to the San Francisco Bay, California, United States.

References

Facelinidae
Gastropods described in 1930